Bosso is a Local Government Area in Niger State, Nigeria. Its headquarters are in the town of Maikunkele.

It has an area of 1,592 km and a population of  
208,212 as projected in 2019 using the national population census figures of 2006 with 2.5% annual growth rate.

The postal code of the area is 920.

Bosso is the home of one of the campuses of the Federal University of Technology Minna. The campus which was originally the main/only campus before the school moved to the new campus at Gidan Kwano.

In 2014, Bosso became home to thousands of refugees fleeing fighting in Borno State. The government of Niger State requested help from UNHCR to build temporary facilities; additional funding is needed for shelter, water, and food.

References

Local Government Areas in Niger State